Matthew Raymond Hauri (born March 19, 1996), known professionally as Yung Gravy, is an American rapper. He first earned recognition in 2016, when his song "Mr. Clean" gained traction on SoundCloud; it is now RIAA-certified Platinum and charted 89 in Australia. Since 2016, he has earned a second RIAA-certified-Platinum record, alongside five RIAA-certified-Gold records. Throughout his career, Yung Gravy has completed ten international tours and has released one mixtape, four albums, and seven EPs. In 2022, he released his first Billboard Hot 100-charting hit, "Betty (Get Money)," which reached a peak position of 30. Yung Gravy is often associated with the SoundCloud rapper era and fellow artists bbno$ and Chief Keef. He has collaborated with artists including Lil Baby, Juicy J, T-Pain and Lil Wayne, as well as TV-personality Martha Stewart.

Early and personal life
Hauri was born in Rochester, Minnesota. His father, Peter Johannes Hauri, was a Swiss-born insomnia psychologist, while his mother is Cynthia Cleveland Hauri. Hauri graduated from Mayo High School in 2014. He attended the University of Wisconsin–Madison and earned his degree in marketing in December 2017. While attending college, he began rapping for fun and started his career on SoundCloud after being inspired by the rise of rappers Lil Yachty and Lil Peep. Hauri described himself as “doing way too much” while in college. Along with rapping, he delivered pizza in college. In 2017, he quit his job and dedicated himself to making music, spending months self-recording songs. Hauri holds dual Swiss and American citizenship, obtaining the former through his Swiss-born father.

Musical style and influences
Yung Gravy's musical style is a blend of modern trap music with vintage themes inspired by the soul and oldies movements of the 1950s and 1960s and soul and funk music of the 1970s and 1980s: his song "Gravy Train" samples Maxine Nightingale's 1976 song "Right Back Where We Started From", and his breakout hit "Mr. Clean" samples the popular 1954 song "Mr. Sandman" by The Chordettes.

His musical style has been described as amusing, energetic, authentic, and bold. Yung Gravy has cited musicians from multiple genres as inspirations — they include hip-hop acts, such as Outkast and Three 6 Mafia, and soul acts, ranging from Smokey Robinson to The Blackbyrds.

Selected events 
In April 2021, Yung Gravy received recognition from the professional hockey team Tampa Bay Lightning, who inscribed the title of Yung Gravy’s track “Gravy Train,” one of the team’s post-game victory songs, on their 2020 Stanley Cup rings. In 2022, Yung Gravy performed at the pregame performance for the Minnesota Vikings and New England Patriots NFL football game on Thanksgiving Day. In 2022, he was also featured on both Jimmy Kimmel Live and the MTV Video Music Awards Pre-Show, performing his hit single, “Betty (Get Money)." In January 2023, Yung Gravy performed at the X Games, hosted in Aspen, Colorado; he also participated in the Special Olympics Unified Skiing competition, where he raced against professional freeskier Tom Wallisch.

Discography

Albums

Extended plays

Mixtapes

Singles

Notes

References 

1996 births
Living people
American people of Swiss descent 
Midwest hip hop musicians
People from Rochester, Minnesota
Rappers from Minnesota
Republic Records artists
Songwriters from Minnesota
21st-century American rappers
Alternative hip hop musicians
Underground rappers
Trap musicians
American comedy musicians
American soul musicians